The 1962 Kansas Jayhawks football team represented the University of Kansas in the Big Eight Conference during the 1962 NCAA University Division football season. In their fifth season under head coach Jack Mitchell, the Jayhawks compiled a 6–3–1 record (4–2–1 against conference opponents), finished fourth in the Big Eight Conference, and outscored all opponents by a combined total of 214 to 116. They played their home games at Memorial Stadium in Lawrence, Kansas.

The team's statistical leaders included Gale Sayers with 1,125 rushing yards, Lloyd Buzzi with 118 receiving yards and Rodger McFarland with 366 passing yards. McFarland and Ken Tiger were the team captains.

Schedule

Roster

References

Kansas
Kansas Jayhawks football seasons
Kansas Jayhawks Kansas